This is a list of the members of the 35th Finnish Parliament, following the 2007 election.

Election results

|-
| style="background-color:#E9E9E9;text-align:left;vertical-align:top;" |Parties
! style="background-color:#E9E9E9;text-align:right;" |Votes
! style="background-color:#E9E9E9;text-align:right;" |%
! style="background-color:#E9E9E9;text-align:right;" |Seats
|-
| style="text-align:left;" |Centre Party (Suomen Keskusta, Centern i Finland)
| style="text-align:right;" |640,428
| style="text-align:right;" |23.1
| style="text-align:right;" |51
|-
| style="text-align:left;" |National Coalition Party (Kansallinen Kokoomus, Samlingspartiet)
| style="text-align:right;" |616,841
| style="text-align:right;" |22.3
| style="text-align:right;" |50
|-
| style="text-align:left;" |Social Democratic Party of Finland (Suomen Sosialidemokraattinen Puolue, Finlands socialdemokratiska parti)
| style="text-align:right;" |594,194
| style="text-align:right;" |21.4
| style="text-align:right;" |45 
|-
| style="text-align:left;" |Left Alliance (Vasemmistoliitto, Vänsterförbundet)
| style="text-align:right;" |244,296
| style="text-align:right;" |8.8
| style="text-align:right;" |17
|-
| style="text-align:left;" |Green League (Vihreä liitto, Gröna förbundet)
| style="text-align:right;" |234,429
| style="text-align:right;" |8.5
| style="text-align:right;" |15
|-
| style="text-align:left;" |Christian Democrats (Kristillisdemokraatit, Kristdemokraterna)
| style="text-align:right;" |134,790
| style="text-align:right;" |4.9
| style="text-align:right;" |7
|-
| style="text-align:left;" |Swedish People's Party (Svenska Folkpartiet, Ruotsalainen kansanpuolue)
| style="text-align:right;" |126,520
| style="text-align:right;" |4.5
| style="text-align:right;" |9
|-
| style="text-align:left;" |True Finns (Perussuomalaiset, Sannfinländarna)
| style="text-align:right;" |112,256
| style="text-align:right;" |4.1
| style="text-align:right;" |5
|-
| style="text-align:left;" |Communist Party of Finland (Suomen Kommunistinen Puolue, Finlands kommunistiska parti)
| style="text-align:right;" |18,277
| style="text-align:right;" |0.7
| style="text-align:right;" |0
|-
| style="text-align:left;" |Seniors' Party of Finland (Suomen Senioripuolue, Finlands Seniorparti)
| style="text-align:right;" |16,715
| style="text-align:right;" |0.6
| style="text-align:right;" |0
|-
| style="text-align:left;" |Bourgeois Alliance (Borgerlig Allians, Åland)
| style="text-align:right;" |9,561
| style="text-align:right;" |0.3
| style="text-align:right;" |1
|-
|style="text-align:left;background-color:#E9E9E9"|Total (turnout 67.9%)
|width="75" style="text-align:right;background-color:#E9E9E9"| 
|width="30" style="text-align:right;background-color:#E9E9E9"| 
|width="30" style="text-align:right;background-color:#E9E9E9"|200
|-
| style="text-align:left;" colspan=4 |Source: Finnish Ministry of Justice
|}

Lists

By party

Social Democratic Party (45)

Left Alliance (17)

Green League (15)

Swedish People's Party  (9)

Christian Democrats (7)

Centre Party (51)

True Finns (5)

National Coalition Party (50)

Changes during the legislation

Representatives who resigned

Representatives who changed parties

References

2007